Alex Hrabina (born 5 April 1995) is a Hungarian football goalkeeper who plays for Nyíregyháza.

Club career
On 2 January 2023, Hrabina returned to Nyíregyháza.

Career statistics

References

External links
 
 

1995 births
People from Nyíregyháza
Sportspeople from Szabolcs-Szatmár-Bereg County
Living people
Hungarian footballers
Hungary youth international footballers
Association football goalkeepers
Nyíregyháza Spartacus FC players
Budaörsi SC footballers
Szolnoki MÁV FC footballers
Gyirmót FC Győr players
Békéscsaba 1912 Előre footballers
Cigánd SE players
Debreceni VSC players
Nemzeti Bajnokság I players
Nemzeti Bajnokság II players